Old Calaboose, also known as Old Springfield City Jail and South Side Calaboose, is a historic jail located at Springfield, Greene County, Missouri. It was built in 1891, and is a two-story, brick and stone gable front building built in the Palladian and Greek traditions.  It measures 26 feet by 26 feet. It was modified in 1921.  The building is open to the public.

It was listed on the National Register of Historic Places in 1980.

References

Government buildings on the National Register of Historic Places in Missouri
Government buildings completed in 1891
Buildings and structures in Springfield, Missouri
National Register of Historic Places in Greene County, Missouri